"Welcome to the Edge" is a song by American singer-songwriter Billie Hughes, from his 1991 album of the same name. Written by Hughes, Roxanne Seeman, and Dominic Messinger, the single was released in Japan by Pony Canyon on May 15, 1991, under the title .

Background 
"Welcome to the Edge" was written by Hughes and Seeman with Messinger, music director and composer of the NBC soap opera Santa Barbara, after a previous song, "Turn it All Around", that Messinger had selected in 1988 to use in connection with a love triangle between the character Julia and Father Michael, became a popular love theme, prompting viewer requests. The song was connected to the character of Robert Barr. As the drama unfolded, "Welcome to the Edge" became a central love theme revolving around the Robert, Kelly Capwell, and Craig Hunt love triangle. Hughes' version was attached to the Robert and Kelly love affair while a female vocal version was attached to the Kelly  and Craig Hunt love affair, with performances airing for two years.

"Welcome to the Edge" was nominated for Outstanding Original Song at the 18th Daytime Emmy Awards in 1991.

Commercial success in Japan 
In 1990, the Japanese duo Wink recorded a version of "Welcome to the Edge" titled , which was the B-side of their single "Yoru ni Hagurete (Where Were You Last Night)". Hughes and Seeman produced a new version of the song using the arrangement of the Wink recording with Chuck Wild programming the track and recording Jimmy Haun's guitar section at Wild's Hollywild Studio. Hughes' vocals' were recorded over the track mix at Glass Sea Studios. The new version became the theme song of the Fuji TV drama I'll Never Love Anyone Anymore. The single hit No. 1 on Oricon's international singles chart and sold over 500,000 copies. Billboard journalist Kaz Fukatsu remarked: "That's an impressive figure, since most karaoke fans can't sing along in English. Five years ago, No. 1 international songs sold only about 40,000 copies."

"Welcome to the Edge" was awarded No. 1 International Single of the Year at the 1992 Japan Gold Disc Awards. Hughes performed the song live for the telecast in Tokyo.

Track listing

Personnel 
 Billie Hughes – vocals, keyboards (2), programming (2)
 Chuck Wild – keyboards (1), programming (1)
 Jimmy Haun – guitar (1)

Chart performance

Certification

Bon Chic version 

Japanese band Bon Chic's version of "Welcome to the Edge" was released through Apollo Sounds Japan through the Hummingbird label on May 29, 1991. This version was used in the next episode announcement of episode 10 of I'll Never Love Anyone Anymore. A remix of the song, known as the "Add 909 Mix", was included in the band's second album Bon Chic II.

Track listing 
All music is arranged by Dada.

Jeniffer version 

Italian singer Jeniffer's version of "Welcome to the Edge" was released through Toshiba EMI on November 6, 1991.

Track listing

Other cover versions

Japan 
 Mie Yamamoto covered "Todokanu Omoi" on her 1991 debut album Sweet Love/Todokanu Omoi.
 The Nolans covered the song on their 1992 compilation album Colorful Nolans.
 Bill Champlin covered the song on the 1992 various artists album Love Stories.

Hong Kong 
 Cherrie Choi covered the song in Cantonese as "Wèi nǐ de mèng lái, wèi nǐ de àishēng" (為你的夢來，為你的愛生, "Come for Your Dream, Live for Your Love") on her 1992 album Liù yuè de àirén (六月的愛人, Lover of June).
 Joyce Lee covered the song in Cantonese as "Qǐng Biǎo Tài" (請表態) on her 1992 album Lee Loksze  (李樂詩, Joyce Lee).

Germany
Santa Barbara aired on RTL under the title California Clan, with a soundtrack album released by Intercord including a cover version of "Welcome to the Edge".

See also 
 List of best-selling singles in Japan
 Big in Japan

References

External links 
 
 

1990 songs
1991 singles
Billie Hughes songs
Songs written by Billie Hughes
Songs written by Dominic Messinger
Songs written by Roxanne Seeman
Pony Canyon singles
Love themes
Television drama theme songs
J-pop songs
Japanese television drama theme songs
Oricon Weekly number-one singles
Wink (duo) songs
Oricon International Singles Chart number-one singles